Cassandra Vasik is a Canadian country music singer-songwriter from Blenheim, Ontario. Signed to Epic Records, she released two albums and 11 singles for the label between 1991 and 1994.

In 1992, she won the Rising Star award at the Canadian Country Music Association Awards. She also won the 1992 and 1994 Juno Award for Best Country Female Vocalist. In 2000, Vasik released a pop album, Different, on Perimeter Records.

Discography

Albums

Singles

Guest singles

Music videos

References

External links
Official website

Canadian women country singers
Canadian country singer-songwriters
Juno Award winners
Musicians from Ontario
People from Chatham-Kent
Living people
Canadian Country Music Association Rising Star Award winners
Year of birth missing (living people)